Department of Records may refer to:
Department of Records (record label)
New York City Department of Records and Information Services